is a Japanese motorcycle racer. He currently races in the MFJ All Japan Road Race Championship JSB1000 class aboard a Honda CBR1000RR. He has also competed in the MFJ All Japan Road Race GP250 Championship, the MFJ All Japan Road Race JSB1000 Championship (where he was champion in 2002), the MFJ All Japan Road Race J-GP2 Championship, Asia Road Race SS600 Championship and the MFJ All Japan Road Race ST600 Championship, where he was champion in 2010 and 2011.

Career statistics

Grand Prix motorcycle racing

By season

Races by year

Supersport World Championship

Races by year
(key)

References

External links

 

1976 births
Living people
Japanese motorcycle racers
250cc World Championship riders
Moto2 World Championship riders
Supersport World Championship riders